Boompa is a rural locality in the Fraser Coast Region, Queensland, Australia.

History 
Teebar East Provisional School opened on 29 May 1893. In 1904 the school was moved and renamed Teebar West Provisional School. On 1 Jan 1909 it became Teebar West State School. In 1930 the school was moved again and was renamed Boompa State School in March 1933. The school closed on 28 January 1963.

In 1922, the residents of the Woocoo Shire erected a war memorial outside St Mary's Church of England on the Maryborough-Biggenden Road at Teebar (now within Boompa). In 1992 the memorial was relocated to the Woocoo Historical Museum in Brooweena due to concerns about vandalism. It is now known as the Brooweena War Memorial.

Elizabeth Mary Thomas nee Eaton, formerly Mrs B J Nichols, donated land from the property Clifton for a church and cemetery. Subscription towards the building fund were made on the understanding that the church was dedicated in the name of St Mary to the memory of Woocoo Shire soldiers killed in action in World War I. Opening services of the St Mary's Anglican Church were held on 26 October 1919.  The church was built by Matthew Edmund Rooney of Maryborough. There is a group of three stained glass windows behind the altar. In 2019 residents and descendants of past residents attended a 100th anniversary service, and a plaque to commemorate the occasion was unveiled in the church grounds. The church is variously described as being located at Boompa, Brooweena, or Teebar.

In the  Boompa had a population of 83 people.

Heritage listing 
Fraser Coast Regional Council placed the St Mary’s Church and Cemetery on its Local Heritage Register.

References

Further reading 

  —includes information on other schools: Braemar, Woocoo, Teebar East, Teebar West, Boompa, Idahlia, Dunmora, Musket Flat, Bowling Green, Aramara North, Aramara, and Gungaloon.

Fraser Coast Region
Localities in Queensland